In mathematics, a homogeneous relation (also called endorelation) on a set X is a binary relation between X and itself, i.e. it is a subset of the Cartesian product . This is commonly phrased as "a relation on X" or "a (binary) relation over X". An example of a homogeneous relation is the relation of kinship, where the relation is between people.

Common types of endorelations include orders, graphs, and equivalences. Specialized studies order theory and graph theory have developed understanding of endorelations. Terminology particular for graph theory is used for description, with an ordinary graph presumed to correspond to a symmetric relation, and a general endorelation corresponding to a directed graph. An endorelation R corresponds to a logical matrix of 0s and 1s, where the expression xRy corresponds to an edge between x and y in the graph, and to a 1 in the square  matrix of R. It is called an adjacency matrix in graph terminology.

Particular homogeneous relations 
Some particular homogeneous relations over a set X (with arbitrary elements) are:
Empty relation 
; that is,  holds never;
Universal relation
; that is,  holds always;
Identity relation (see also identity function)
}; that is,  holds if and only if .

Example

Fifteen large tectonic plates of the Earth's crust contact each other in a homogeneous relation. The relation can be expressed as a logical matrix with 1 indicating contact and 0 no contact. This example expresses a symmetric relation.

Properties 

Some important properties that a homogeneous relation  over a set  may have are:
  for all , . For example, ≥ is a reflexive relation but > is not.
  (or ) for all , not . For example, > is an irreflexive relation, but ≥ is not.
  for all , if  then . For example, the relation over the integers in which each odd number is related to itself is a coreflexive relation. The equality relation is the only example of a both reflexive and coreflexive relation, and any coreflexive relation is a subset of the identity relation.
  for all , if  then .
  for all , if  then .
A relation is quasi-reflexive if, and only if, it is both left and right quasi-reflexive.

The latter two facts also rule out (any kind of) quasi-reflexivity.

  for all , if  then .
  for all , if  and  then . For example, ≥ is an antisymmetric relation; so is >, but vacuously (the condition in the definition is always false).
  for all , if  then not . A relation is asymmetric if and only if it is both antisymmetric and irreflexive. For example, > is an asymmetric relation, but ≥ is not.

  for all , if  and  then . A transitive relation is irreflexive if and only if it is asymmetric. For example, "is ancestor of" is a transitive relation, while "is parent of" is not.
  for all , if  and  then never .
  if the complement of R is transitive. This is used in pseudo-orders in constructive mathematics.
  for all , if  and  but neither  nor , then  but not .  
This is used in weak orderings.
Again, the previous 5 alternatives are not exhaustive. For example, the relation  if ( or ) satisfies none of these properties. On the other hand, the empty relation trivially satisfies all of them.

This is used in dense orders.
This property is sometimes called "total", which is distinct from the definitions of "left/right-total" given below.
This property, too, is sometimes called "total", which is distinct from the definitions of "left/right-total" given below.
For example, > is a trichotomous relation, while the relation "divides" over the natural numbers is not.
  (or just ) for all , if  and  then . For example, = is a Euclidean relation because if  and  then .
  for all , if  and  then .
Well-foundedness implies the descending chain condition (that is, no infinite chain ...  can exist). If the axiom of dependent choice is assumed, both conditions are equivalent.

Moreover, all properties of binary relations in general also may apply to homogeneous relations:
 for all , the class of all  such that  is a set. (This makes sense only if relations over proper classes are allowed.)
   for all  and all , if  and  then . 
  for all  and all , if  and  then .
  (also called left-total) for all  there exists a  such that . This property is different from the definition of connected (also called total by some authors).
  (also called right-total) for all , there exists an  such that xRy.

A  is a relation that is reflexive and transitive.

A , also called , is a relation that is reflexive, antisymmetric, and transitive. A , also called , is a relation that is irreflexive, antisymmetric, and transitive.

A  is a relation that is symmetric and transitive. An  is a relation that is reflexive, symmetric, and transitive. It is also a relation that is symmetric, transitive, and total, since these properties imply reflexivity.

Operations 
If R is a homogeneous relation over a set X then each of the following is a homogeneous relation over X:
 , R= Defined as R= = {(x, x) | x ∈ X} ∪ R or the smallest reflexive relation over X containing R. This can be proven to be equal to the intersection of all reflexive relations containing R.
 , R≠ Defined as R≠ = R \ {(x, x) | x ∈ X} or the largest irreflexive relation over X contained in R.
 , R+ Defined as the smallest transitive relation over X containing R. This can be seen to be equal to the intersection of all transitive relations containing R.
 , R≡ Defined as the smallest equivalence relation over X containing R.

All operations defined in  also apply to homogeneous relations.
 
 {| class="wikitable sortable" style="text-align:center;"
|+ Homogeneous relations by property
|-
!
! Reflexivity
! Symmetry
! Transitivity
! Connectedness
! Symbol
! Example
|-
! Directed graph
|
|
|
|
| →
|
|-
! Undirected graph
|
| 
|
|
|
|
|-
! Dependency
| 
| 
|
|
|
|
|-
! Tournament
| 
| 
|
|
|
| Pecking order
|-
! Preorder
| 
|
| 
|
| ≤
| Preference
|-
! Total preorder
| 
|
| 
| 
| ≤
|
|-
! Partial order
| 
| 
| 
|
| ≤
| Subset
|-
! Strict partial order
| 
| 
| 
|
| <
| Strict subset
|-
! Total order
| 
| 
| 
| 
| ≤
| Alphabetical order
|-
! Strict total order
| 
| 
| 
| 
| <
| Strict alphabetical order
|-
! Partial equivalence relation
|
| 
| 
|
|
|
|-
! Equivalence relation
| 
| 
| 
|
| ∼, ≡
| Equality
|}

Enumeration 
The set of all homogeneous relations  over a set X is the set  which is a Boolean algebra augmented with the involution of mapping of a relation to its converse relation.

The number of distinct homogeneous relations over an n-element set is  :

Notes:
 The number of irreflexive relations is the same as that of reflexive relations.
 The number of strict partial orders (irreflexive transitive relations) is the same as that of partial orders.
 The number of strict weak orders is the same as that of total preorders.
 The total orders are the partial orders that are also total preorders. The number of preorders that are neither a partial order nor a total preorder is, therefore, the number of preorders, minus the number of partial orders, minus the number of total preorders, plus the number of total orders: 0, 0, 0, 3, and 85, respectively.
 The number of equivalence relations is the number of partitions, which is the Bell number.

The homogeneous relations can be grouped into pairs (relation, complement), except that for  the relation is its own complement. The non-symmetric ones can be grouped into quadruples (relation, complement, inverse, inverse complement).

Examples 
 Order relations, including strict orders:
 Greater than
 Greater than or equal to
 Less than
 Less than or equal to
 Divides (evenly)
 Subset of
 Equivalence relations:
 Equality
 Parallel with (for affine spaces)
 Equinumerosity or "is in bijection with"
 Isomorphic
 Equipollent line segments
 Tolerance relation, a reflexive and symmetric relation:
 Dependency relation, a finite tolerance relation
 Independency relation, the complement of some dependency relation
 Kinship relations

Generalizations 
 A binary relation in general need not be homogeneous, it is defined to be a subset R ⊆ X × Y for arbitrary sets X and Y.
 A finitary relation is a subset R ⊆ X1 × ... × Xn for some natural number n and arbitrary sets X1, ...,  Xn, it is also called an n-ary relation.

References

Binary relations